Medvedki is a rural locality (a village) in Cheryomushskoye Rural Settlement of Kotlassky District, Arkhangelsk Oblast, Russia. The population was 2 as of 2010. There are 6 streets.

Geography 
Medvedki is located on the Ukhtomka River, 25 km south of Kotlas (the district's administrative centre) by road. Pustosh is the nearest rural locality.

References 

Rural localities in Kotlassky District